Michael Manning (born 4 October 1962) is an English former professional darts player who played in Professional Darts Corporation (PDC) events.

Career
Manning first made his name in early 1988 when he reached the semi-final of the BDO British Open. Shortly after this he beat World Champion Bob Anderson, Kevin Spiolek and Eric Bristow in a run a to the final of the Dry Blackthorn Cider Masters. In 1994 Manning joined the PDC and beat Rod Harrington on the way to winning the Isle of Man Open the same year. Manning also ventured into Soft Tip and twice won the Soft Tip Bullshooter World Championship in 1998 and 2004. Manning regularly appeared on TV from the mid-nineties until his last TV appearance in 2005 and despite winning numerous matches on TV could never progress beyond the last 16 of any TV tournament.

World Championship performances

PDC
 1998: Last 24 Group: (lost to Graeme Stoddart 0–3) & (beat to Keith Deller 3–2)
 1999: Last 16: (lost to Dennis Smith 1–3)
 2000: Last 32: (lost to Phil Taylor 0–3)
 2001: Last 32: (lost to Dave Askew 2–3)
 2002: Last 32: (lost to John Part 2–4)
 2003: Last 32: (lost to Ronnie Baxter 1–4)
 2004: Last 40: (lost to Wayne Atwood 0–3)
 2005: Last 40: (lost to Andy Hamilton 0–3)

References

External links

1962 births
Living people
English darts players
Professional Darts Corporation former pro tour players